George Frederick Deacon ( – ) was an English civil engineer.

A pupil and lifelong friend of William Thomson, 1st Baron Kelvin, Deacon was Lord Kelvin's assistant on the SS Great Eastern cable-laying expedition. He was both borough engineer and water engineer to Liverpool from 1871 to 1880, and water engineer to the city from  1880 to 1890. During this latter period, jointly with Thomas Hawksley, he designed the Lake Vyrnwy scheme to supply Liverpool's water. Deacon was solely responsible for the design of the Lake Vyrnwy Straining Tower, designed in a Gothic Revival style. In 1890 he established a consultancy in Westminster which designed waterworks for many UK towns. This merged with another firm to become Alexander Binnie & Sons, Deacon.

Amongst his inventions were the Deacon waste-water meter to locate water leakage, and electrical meters to measure river flow.

At the time of his death he was working on a scheme to provide water to Birkenhead from the River Alwen.

References

External links
 

1843 births
1909 deaths
British civil engineers
English civil engineers
Presidents of the Smeatonian Society of Civil Engineers
People from Bridgwater